SAJC may refer to:

 Saint Andrew's Junior College, a pre-university school in Singapore
 Seth Anandram Jaipuria College, Kolkata, India
 South Australian Jockey Club